Paul Jones (1901–1968) was an American film producer. His major work was done for Paramount Pictures.

Career
Jones produced films directed by Preston Sturges and those featuring Bob Hope, Dean Martin and Jerry Lewis. He also produced the Red Skelton comedy A Southern Yankee (1948) for Metro-Goldwyn-Mayer.

External links

1901 births
1968 deaths
American film producers
20th-century American businesspeople